Orange Roughies is a New Zealand television drama created by Auckland-based film company Screenworks, the first season of which was screened on TV ONE from May to July 2006. The second season was due to be shown some time between October 2006 and January 2007, but due to poor ratings the programme was taken off the air.

An orange roughy, Hoplostethus atlanticus. is a type of fish.

About the show
The show centres around four main characters who are members of an elite taskforce in Auckland combining police and customs officers. Despite being an elite force, they are, as their commander Ron Maddock (Stephen Hall) remind them, underfunded, under-resourced and under the hammer. Because of this the Roughies (as they are called) have to make sure that they perform exceptionally well to avoid being canned, as they are, after all, an experiment. The Roughies are Detective Sergeant Danny Wilder (Nicholas Coghlan), Senior Customs Officer Jane Durant (Zoe Naylor), Detective Constable Zach Wiki (Mark Ruka) and Noel Bullerton (Nick Kemplen).

Each episode concerns a police or customs enquiry carried out by the taskforce, often of a high-risk nature.

The first episode deals with child trafficking from China. Jane decides to adopt one of the trafficked children, Tao Li, but several episodes later Tao is taken back to China, leaving Jane once again childless. There is also a romance that gradually develops between Danny and Jane, culminating in a kiss discovered by Maddock.

The first season ends with Jane being taken hostage by a homosexual Greek criminal and being shot in the stomach. It is uncertain whether she survives. Danny manages to track down the shooter in Melbourne and kills him.

Cast

Primary
Nicholas Coghlan as Detective Sergeant Danny Wilder 
Zoe Naylor as Jane Durrant 
Mark Ruka as Zack Wiki 
Caroline Craig as Chloe Meachen
Stephen Hall  as Ron Maddock
Nick Kemplen as Noel Bullerton.

Secondary
Nicole Whippy as Donna Wiki, Zack's wife and a nurse at the local hospital
Roy Snow as Denis Fielding, Jane's flatmate
Olivia James-Baird as Sophie Wilder, Danny's daughter
William Wallace as Tom Bowden
Sean Duffy as Paul Grayson
Blair Strang as DS Sean Parkes
Kimberley Ooi as Tao Li 
Peter Daube as David Chambers
Stephen Butterworth as George "Sugarplum" Economou
Andrew Robertt as Leo Sullivan

Guest
Ingrid Park as Helen Moore
Katherine Kennard as Maria Hanniford
Josephine Davison as Jackie Sullivan
Toni Potter as Cheryl Bowden

Music
The soundtrack for Orange Roughies was composed mostly by Don McGlashan, who also wrote the music for Screenworks' other major television series, Street Legal. However, the opening credits are accompanied by the song Long White Cross performed by an from Auckland band, Pluto.

Locations 
Orange Roughies was shot in the central business district of Auckland CBD. Locations included:
police station with firearm storage - AUT University Design Building, Studio Entrance
airport arrival hall - AUT University Administration Building (WA) foyer, Conference Centre
airport Customs office - AUT University Administration Building (WA), security control room
cutaway scene at bus station - Britomart Terminus
party on boat - City Viaduct, close to ferry terminal.

External links
Orange Roughies at TVNZ's website
Orange Roughies on IMDb

2006 New Zealand television series debuts
2008 New Zealand television series endings
New Zealand drama television series
Television shows funded by NZ on Air
TVNZ 1 original programming